Einda Thiri (also known as Saw Hla Htut) was a daughter of King Mohnyin Thado of Ava, and governor of Pagan. The princess was the first known female ruler of the Pagan (Bagan) capital region. Her tenure at the ancient capital city of Pagan (Bagan) probably began . Chronicles do not say when her tenure at Pagan ended.

Notes

References

Bibliography
 
 

Ava dynasty
1410s births